Marcelo Veridiano (born June 30, 1966) is a former Brazilian footballer.

Club career
His professional career started at 1986 with São Paulo. He played for São Paulo until 1989 when he was acquired by Skoda Xanthi. He instantly became the club's star scoring 11 goals in just 21 matches. His best season with Skoda Xanthi was 1992–1993 when he scored 24 goals in 32 matches being the league's third goalscorer. He was the first player to score 4 goals in a match in the Greek professional championship in an 8–2 win against Pierikos on January 10, 1993 (Skoda Xanthi's biggest league win ever). He is also Skoda Xanti's all-time top goalscorer with 75 goals and the player who scored both the 100th (May 22, 1992 against Aris Thessaloniki) and the 200th (February 13, 1994 against Panathinaikos) Skoda Xanthi's league goal. He played for the Thracian club until 1996, when he moved to AEK Athens. In 1998, he was transferred to APOEL and helped his team to win the 1998–1999 Cypriot Cup, scoring twice in the Cup final where APOEL won 2–0 Anorthosis. He ended his career with Kozani in 2001.

Honours
São Paulo
Campeonato Paulista: 1987, 1989

AEK Athens
Greek Cup: 1996–97
Greek Super Cup: 1996

APOEL
Cypriot Cup: 1998–99

References

External links
Career Overview
Entry at Globo Esporte's Futpédia

1966 births
Living people
Brazilian footballers
Brazilian expatriate footballers
Brazilian expatriate sportspeople in Cyprus
Association football forwards
AC Omonia managers
APOEL FC players
AEK Athens F.C. players
São Paulo FC players
Kozani F.C. players
Esporte Clube Bahia players
Xanthi F.C. players
Super League Greece players
Cypriot First Division players
Expatriate footballers in Cyprus
Expatriate footballers in Greece
Brazilian football managers
Footballers from São Paulo